The Panwar dynasty ruled the Garhwal Kingdom (present day Uttarakhand). The dynasty independently ruled Garhwal from the ninth to nineteenth century until the Kingdom of Nepal attacked the Kumaon Kingdom in 1791 and Garhwal in 1804. With the help of the British troops, Garhwal and Kumaon gained independence from Nepal. Unable to pay the military cost of British-ruled India, the then-Garhwali king gave part of his territory to the Raj and ruled until 1949. The last king of Garhwal, Manabendra Shah, decided to join India after it became independent. Garhwal and Kumaon became part of India as the then-state of Uttar Pradesh, which is now Uttarakhand. Pt. Harikrishna Raturi king Bhanu Pratap was the first ruler of Panwar dynasty in Garhwal who founded Chandpur-Garhi as his capital. This was is strongest Garh for the fifty-two Garhs of Garhwal.

See also 
 Panwar
 Paramara dynasty

References

External links 
https://theexampillar.com/history-of-panwar-dynasty-in-uttarakhand/
https://wegarhwali.com/history-of-panwar-parmar-dynasty-of-uttarakhand-in-hindi/
https://www.researchgate.net/profile/Dr-Meharban-Gusain/publication/322698599_history_of_uttrakhand/links/5a69da314585154d15450b50/history-of-uttrakhand.pdf
https://www.uou.ac.in/sites/default/files/slm/BTTM-601.pdf
https://www.tribuneindia.com/news/archive/features/pivot-of-states-history%E2%80%94tehri-garhwal-196215

Rajput clans
Rajput clans of Uttarakhand
Garhwali Rajputs
Kumaoni Rajputs
Rajputs
Panwar dynasty